is a Japanese former professional baseball pitcher. He has played in Nippon Professional Baseball (NPB) for the Tokyo Yakult Swallows.

Career

On March 30, 2010, Nakazawa made his NPB debut.

On October 24, 2020, Nakazawa announced his retirement.

References

External links

 NPB.com

1985 births
Living people
Baseball people from Toyama Prefecture
Chuo University alumni
Japanese baseball players
Nippon Professional Baseball pitchers
Tokyo Yakult Swallows players